The Bluefield Shale is a geologic formation in Virginia. It preserves fossils dating back to the Carboniferous period.

See also

 List of fossiliferous stratigraphic units in Virginia
 Paleontology in Virginia
 Bluefield Formation

References

 

Carboniferous geology of Virginia
Carboniferous southern paleotropical deposits